Creeping Shadows is a 1931 British crime film directed by John Orton and starring Franklin Dyall, Arthur Hardy and Margot Grahame. It was made at the Welwyn Studios of British International Pictures. It was released in American under the alternative title The Limping Man, which was the name of the original West End play by William Matthew Scott on which the film is based.

Plot
Three victims plan to murder a retired informant.

Cast
 Franklin Dyall as Disher  
 Arthur Hardy as Sir Edwin Paget  
 Margot Grahame as Gloria Paget  
 Lester Matthews as Brian Nash  
 Jeanne Stuart as Olga Hoyt  
 Gerald Rawlinson as Paul Tegle  
 David Hawthorne as Peter Hoyt 
 Charles Farrell as Chicago Joe  
 Henrietta Watson as Lady Paget  
 Matthew Boulton as Inspector Potter 
 Percy Parsons as Limping Man 
 Hal Gordon
 Samuel Pringle
 Ernest Stidwell

References

Bibliography
 Low, Rachael. Filmmaking in 1930s Britain. George Allen & Unwin, 1985.
 Wood, Linda. British Films, 1927-1939. British Film Institute, 1986.

External links

1931 films
British crime films
1931 crime films
1930s English-language films
Films shot at Welwyn Studios
Films set in England
British black-and-white films
1930s British films
British films based on plays